A pizza bagel is a bagel with pizza toppings, originating in the United States.

History
Anthony DeMauro invented the pizza bagel in 1959 at Amster's Bagel Bakery (now closed) in South Euclid, a suburb of Cleveland, Ohio. It was not until May 26, 1970, when Amster Pizza Bagel, Inc. submitted registration for Pizza Bagels to the US Copyright Office. Out of Cleveland's famous West Side Market, Frickaccio's sells their legendary pizza bagels. Theirs have been featured on the Food Network and were enjoyed by President Barack Obama during a lunchtime visit to West Side Market.

In 1974 at a Western Bagel in Woodland Hills, California, 17-year-old store clerk Bruce Treitman created what is now known as the pizza bagel: a flattened bagel with marinara sauce and mozzarella cheese.

In early 2014, Katz Bagel Bakery in Chelsea, Massachusetts claimed that Harry Katz invented a variation of this pizza bagel in 1970. Unlike traditional pizza bagels, Katz' version is similar to a miniature pizza. Katz uses bagel dough without the hole, topped with cheese and tomato sauce.

Other uses 
The term "pizza bagel" also means a person of Italian and Jewish descent. This is most likely because pizza is a dish of Italian origin, and bagels are of Ashkenazi Jewish origin.

Commercial distribution 
The Bagel Bites brand was inspired by the pizza bagel. Bagel Bites are a miniature, frozen version of the pizza bagel sold in commercial grocery stores.

See also
 Bagel and cream cheese
 Bialy (bread)
 List of bread dishes

References

External links
 

Bagels
Jewish baked goods
Pizza styles
Bread dishes